The following outline is provided as an overview of and topical guide to web design and web development, two very related fields:

Web design encompasses many different skills and disciplines in the production and maintenance of websites. The different areas of web design include web graphic design; interface design; authoring, including standardized code and proprietary software; user experience design; and search engine optimization. Often many individuals will work in teams covering different aspects of the design process, although some designers will cover them all. The term web design is normally used to describe the design process relating to the front-end (client side) design of a website including writing markup. Web design partially overlaps web engineering in the broader scope of web development. Web designers are expected to have an awareness of usability and if their role involves creating markup then they are also expected to be up to date with web accessibility guidelines.

Web development is the work involved in developing a web site for the Internet (World Wide Web) or an intranet (a private network). Web development can range from developing a simple single static page of plain text to complex web-based internet applications (web apps), electronic businesses, and social network services. A more comprehensive list of tasks to which web development commonly refers, may include web engineering, web design, web content development, client liaison, client-side/server-side scripting, web server and network security configuration, and e-commerce development.

Among web professionals, "web development" usually refers to the main non-design aspects of building web sites: writing markup and coding. Web development may use content management systems (CMS) to make content changes easier and available with basic technical skills.

For larger organizations and businesses, web development teams can consist of hundreds of people (web developers) and follow standard methods like Agile methodologies while developing websites. Smaller organizations may only require a single permanent or contracting developer, or secondary assignment to related job positions such as a graphic designer or information systems technician. Web development may be a collaborative effort between departments rather than the domain of a designated department. There are three kinds of web developer specialization: front-end developer, back-end developer, and full-stack developer. Front-end developers are responsible for behaviour and visuals that run in the user browser, back-end developers deal with the servers and full-stack developers are responsible for both. Currently, the demand for React and Node.JS developers are very high all over the world.

Web design 
 Graphic design
 Typography
 Page layout
 User experience design (UX design)
 User interface design (UI design)
 Web Design techniques
 Responsive web design (RWD)
 Adaptive web design (AWD)
 Progressive enhancement
 Tableless web design
 Software
 Adobe Photoshop
 Adobe Illustrator
 Sketch (software)
 Affinity Designer
 Inkscape

Web development 
 Front-end web development – the practice of converting data to a graphical interface, through the use of HTML, CSS, and JavaScript, so that users can view and interact with that data.
 HTML (HyperText Markup Language) (*.html)
 CSS (Cascading Style Sheets) (*.css)
 CSS framework
 JavaScript (*.js)
 Package managers for JavaScript
 npm (originally short for Node Package Manager)
 Server-side scripting (also known as "Server-side (web) development" or "Back-end (web) development")
 ActiveVFP (*.avfp)
 ASP (*.asp)
 ASP.NET Web Forms (*.aspx)
 ASP.NET Web Pages (*.cshtml, *.vbhtml)
 ColdFusion Markup Language (*.cfm)
 Go (*.go)
 Google Apps Script (*.gs)
 Hack (*.php)
 Haskell (*.hs) (example: Yesod)
 Java (*.jsp) via JavaServer Pages
 JavaScript using Server-side JavaScript (*.ssjs, *.js) (example: Node.js)
 Lasso (*.lasso)
 Lua (*.lp *.op *.lua)
 NodeJS (*.node)
 Parser (*.p)
 Perl via the CGI.pm module (*.cgi, *.ipl, *.pl)
 PHP (*.php, *.php3, *.php4, *.phtml)
 Progress WebSpeed (*.r,*.w)
 Python (*.py) (examples: Pyramid, Flask, Django)
 R (*.rhtml) – (example: rApache)
 React (*.jsx)
 Ruby (*.rb, *.rbw) (example: Ruby on Rails)
 SMX (*.smx)
 Tcl (*.tcl)
 WebDNA (*.dna,*.tpl)
 Full stack web development – involves both front-end and back-end (server-side) development
 Web framework
 Types of framework architectures
 Model–view–controller
 Three-tier architecture
 Software
 Atom
 IntelliJ IDEA
 Sublime Text
 Visual Studio Code

See also 
 Outline of computers
 Outline of computing and Outline of information technology
 Outline of computer science
 Outline of artificial intelligence
 Outline of cryptography
 Outline of the Internet
 Outline of Google
 Outline of software
 Types of software
 Outline of free software
 Outline of search engines
 Outline of software development
 Outline of software engineering
 Outline of web design and web development
 Outline of computer programming
 Programming languages
 Outline of C++
 Outline of Perl
 Outline of computer engineering

References

External links 

 
 
 
Computer programming